Corinthia Hotels Limited (CHL), based in Malta, is the operator and developer for Corinthia hotels in Europe, Africa and The Middle East. CHL operates restaurants such as Rickshaw, and has a spa division. It is wholly owned by International Hotel Investments (IHI]).

History 
Founded by Alfred Pisani and his family in Malta in 1962 the inaugural hotel, Corinthia Palace Hotel & Spa in Attard, was first opened as a restaurant and was later developed into a hotel. Pisani has been chairman since the company's inception.

Corinthia has hotels in locations including London, Budapest, Prague, Saint Petersburg, Lisbon, Malta and Tripoli. Projects under the Corinthia Hotels brand are under development in Brussels, Dubai, Bucharest and Moscow.

Properties 
Current 
 Corinthia London - London, United Kingdom
 Corinthia St. Petersburg - St Petersburg, Russia
 Corinthia Budapest - Budapest, Hungary
 Corinthia Tripoli - Tripoli, Libya
 Corinthia Lisbon - Lisbon, Portugal
 Corinthia Prague - Prague, Czech Republic
 Corinthia St George's Bay - St Julian's, Malta
 Corinthia Palace Hotel & Spa - San Anton, Attard, Malta
 Corinthia Khartoum - Khartoum, Sudan

Upcoming 

 Corinthia Meydan Beach Dubai - Dubai, United Arab Emirates
Corinthia Grand Hotel Astoria - Brussels, Belgium
 Corinthia Grand Hotel du Boulevard Bucharest – Bucharest, Romania
 Corinthia Hotel & Residences Moscow – Moscow, Russia

Independent hotels

 The Aquincum Hotel Budapest - Budapest, Hungary
 Ramada Plaza Tunis - Carthage, Tunisia
 Marina Hotel Corinthia Beach Resort - St Julian's, Malta
 Raddison Blu Resort & Spa, Golden Sands Malta
 Raddison Blu Resort, St Julian’s Malta
 Panorama Hotel - Prague, Czech Republic
 Meydan Hotel – Dubai, United Arab Emirates
 Bab al Shams Desert Resort – Dubai, United Arab Emirates

Former hotels
 Corinthia Jerma Palace Hotel - Marsascala, Malta
 Corinthia Mistra Village Club Hotel - Xemxija, Malta

References

External links

 

1962 establishments in Malta
Hospitality companies established in 1962
Hospitality companies of Malta
Hotel chains
Hotels in Malta
Maltese brands